There are several secondary schools called Union County High School in the United States:

Union County High School (Florida) located in Lake Butler, Union County, Florida
Union County High School (Georgia) located in Blairsville, Georgia
Union County High School (Indiana) located in Liberty, Indiana
Union County High School (Kentucky) located in Morganfield, Kentucky
Union County High School (South Carolina) located in Union, South Carolina
Union County High School (Tennessee), formerly Horace Maynard High School, located in Maynardville, Tennessee